The  is a tourist company operating hotels and amusement parks, mainly in Hokkaidō, Japan. The company is headquartered in Sapporo. Its most important resort facility has been Rusutsu Resort. The company was founded in 1981, and its group rapidly expanded after 1998, through mergers of underperforming facilities.

Group facilities

Resort
Rusutsu Resort: Rusutsu, Hokkaidō. Hotels, ski areas, an amusement park, golf courses
Sahoro Resort: Shintoku, Hokkaidō. Hotels, ski areas, a bear park, golf courses

Leisure facilities
Teine Olympia Amusement Park: Teine, Sapporo, Hokkaidō
IPC Wan-Nyan Pet Park: Chūō, Sapporo, Hokkaidō
Lake Shikotsu Sightseeing Boat: Chitose, Hokkaidō
Noboribetsu Bear Park: Noboribetsu, Hokkaidō
Noboribetsu Marine Park Nixe: Noboribetsu, Hokkaidō. A public aquarium
Himeji Central Park: Himeji, Hyōgo, Hyōgo. A safari park, an amusement park
Space World, Yahata Higashi, Kitakyūshū, Fukuoka. An amusement park (Closing 2017)
Lone Pine Koala Sanctuary: Fig Tree Pocket, Queensland, Australia

Ski areas
Sapporo Teine: Teine, Sapporo, Hokkaidō. Including Teineyama Ropeway
Nakayama-tōge Ski Field: Kimobetsu, Hokkaidō
Hakodate Yokotsudake Ski Field: Nanae, Hokkaidō
Appi Kōgen Ski Field: Hachimantai, Iwate
Getō Kōgen Ski Field: Kitakami, Iwate
Ontake Ski Field: Ōtaki, Nagano
Noboribetsu Sanraiba Ski Field: Noboribetsu, Hokkaidō

Hotels
Nakayamatōge Kōgen Hotel: Kimonetsu, Hokkaidō
Niseko Yamada Onsen Hotel: Kutchan, Hokkaidō
Art Hotels Sapporo: Chūō, Sapporo, Hokkaidō
Morioka Grand Hotel: Morioka, Iwate
Art Hotels Hamamatsuchō: Minato, Tōkyō
Art Hotels Ōmori: Shinagawa, Tōkyō
Suginoi Hotel: Beppu, Ōita

Golf courses
Royal Ship Sapporo Golf Club: Ishikari, Hokkaidō
Noboribetsu Onsen Golf Club: Noboribetsu, Hokkaidō
Orika Golf Club: Minamifurano, Hokkaidō
Hakodate Yokotsu Golf Course: Nanae, Hokkaidō
Maple Country Club: Takizawa, Iwate

Others
Onsen (hot spring)
Roadside Station
Bus
College
Restaurant
Apartment

External links
 Official website
  Rusutsu Resort official website

Companies based in Sapporo